Sergeant Terrence Begley (died 25 August 1864) was an Irish soldier who fought in the American Civil War. Begley was awarded the United States' highest award for bravery during combat, the Medal of Honor, for his action during the Battle of Cold Harbor in Cold Harbor, Virginia on 3 June 1864. He was honored posthumously with the award on 1 December 1864.

Biography
Begley was born in Ireland and enlisted at age 20 in the Army from Albany, New York in February 1864. Begley was killed in combat during the Second Battle of Ream's Station at Reams Station, Virginia on 25 August 1864, just two months after the actions that led to his Medal of Honor award.

Medal of Honor citation

See also

List of American Civil War Medal of Honor recipients: A–F

References

1864 deaths
Irish-born Medal of Honor recipients
Union Army soldiers
United States Army Medal of Honor recipients
American Civil War recipients of the Medal of Honor
Union military personnel killed in the American Civil War
Year of birth missing